Pine Island Airport  is a privately owned airport, located in the town of Corolla, North Carolina, owned by Turnpike Properties. The FAA ID is 7NC2 and IATA code DUF. The airport has one 3,450 ft. runway, designated runway 17/35. As of March 10, 2017, the airport is operational with restrictions Airstrip is for private use only.  Contact Airport Manager, Atlantic Realty of the Outer Banks for use  Overnight parking is not permitted.

References

Airports in North Carolina
Buildings and structures in Currituck County, North Carolina
Transportation in Currituck County, North Carolina
Privately owned airports